Kreischberg is an Austrian ski resort in Styria, Austria. 
The area includes the adjacent Rosenkranzhöhe and offers 40 kilometres of slopes altogether. In December 2013, Kreischberg was considered the first 10-seater gondola in Styria. In recent years the resort has been awarded multiple times for its high quality slopes.

Landscape
Compared to other ski resorts, Kreischberg is known for an above-average amount of snowboarders, which is due to very broad and some relatively flat slopes. For this reason, it has been a venue for multiple national and international snowboarding competitions.

Competitions
In addition to the FIS Snowboarding World Championships in 2003, FIS-Telemark-World Cup in 2009 and other international competitions, the FIS Freestyle Ski and Snowboarding World Championships 2015 was held at Kreischberg and Lachtal Ski Area from January 15 to the 25th.

Management and operation
Since August 2014, Karl Fussi and Reinhard Kargl as managing directors have been in charge of the ski resort.
Kreischberg owns 88,5 % of the nearby ski resort Lachtal. Due to this close cooperation, a joint ticket is offered for the two ski areas.

Background
The ski resort is named after a flattening north from Rosenkranzhöhe (2118 m.a.A) and is located in the northeastern part of the Gurktal Alps, at 1981 m.a.A. Especially at the northern part of the mountain (Sankt Georgen ob Murau, Stadl an der Mur) there are several logging roads and trails.

International Competitions 
The Kreischberg ski resort has been the host of the FIS Freestyle Ski & Snowboard World Cup, taking place from January 15 to 25 in 2015.
Based on their own measurements, Kreischberg has the largest halfpipe in Europe and they regularly contribute to the Snowboarding World Cup competitions. 
In 2003, the Kreischberg hosted the FIS Snowboard World Cup, and during the 2004/05 season, they were the first ski resort in Austria to host the FIS-Skicross World Cup. In January 2009, the FIS-Telemark was held at Kreischberg.

Lift operation and other equipment 
The Kreischberg owns the following chairlifts and gondolas:
10-seater gondola
2 gondolas "Gondelbahn 1. und 2. Sektion"
Six-seater chair lift "Sixpack"
Four-seater chair lift "Schopfart"
2 double-chair lifts "Ochsenberg" and "Rosenkranz"
4 tow lifts "Kreischi", "Sunshine I & II" and "Rosenkranz"
2 practise lifts
Tubing lift

The 6-seater chairlift dates back to the 2008-09 season. In summer 2012, the area called “Riegleralm” was developed, increasing the amount of slopes offered by Kreischberg up to 40 kilometres.

Kreischberg 10er - 2021 Projekt: The gondola lift for up to 6 passengers (built in 1992) will be replaced with a new gondola lift for up to 10 passengers. This will be a 40 million Euro investment which includes the gondola lift and new buildings for valley-, middle-, and mountain stations.

In December 2015, a new Freestyle park for snowboarders and freeskiers opened in Kreischberg, at 1,900 m.a.A. It got named “Snowpark Kreischberg” and is being operated by QParks. The park consists of one beginner line with three kickers, one wave run jump, 4 butter boxes (dance floor, rainbow, wave, flat/down), a beginner banked ramp and a medium line. 
The medium line consists of 11 different elements, including various kickers, tubes, jibs, rails and boxes.

External links 

 Website of the Kreischberg Murtal Seilbahnen Betriebs GmbH
 Website of the tourist office Murau Kreischberg
 Website QParks

References 

Ski areas and resorts in Austria